Marcel Wszołek (born 11 March 2002) is a Polish professional footballer who plays primarily as a midfielder but can also play in defence. He currently plays for ŁKS Łódź.

Biography

Early years
Born in Grudziądz, Wszołek started playing football with the youth sides of his local team Olimpia Grudziądz. He was prolific in his youth years with Olimpia, in one season scoring 24 goals in 15 appearances, including scoring 9 goals in a 29–0 win over ROL.KO Konojady. In 2016 he joined the Lechia Gdańsk Academy, where he started to take a deeper role on the pitch, playing more commonly as a midfielder or a defender instead of holding an attacking position. In 2018 he signed his first professional contract with Lechia, and started training with the Lechia Gdańsk II team. He made his Lechia II debut on 15 August 2018, playing the full game in a 5–0 win. Wszołek never managed to progress and break into the first team, but with his 2 years at Lechia he made a total of 29 league appearances and scored 3 goals for the second team. Lechia opted to not extend his contract, allowing the player to leave on a free. Over the summer of 2020 Wszołek joined I liga team ŁKS Łódź, initially playing with the youth team.

References

2002 births
Living people
Polish footballers
Poland youth international footballers
Association football defenders
Association football midfielders
Olimpia Grudziądz players
Lechia Gdańsk players
ŁKS Łódź players